Nattung, New South Wales is a civil parish of Cowley County, New South Wales.
It lies in the headwaters of the Murrumbidgee River and in the Kosciuszko National Park. It is uninhabited.

References

Parishes of Cowley County
Snowy Monaro Regional Council